Emeroleter is an extinct genus of nycteroleterid parareptile known from the early Late Permian of European Russia. It was a long-legged lizard-like small animal with a length about 30 cm.

References

Permian reptiles of Europe
Pareiasauromorphs
Fossil taxa described in 1997
Prehistoric reptile genera